Mohammed Fahmi (born 23 May 1958 in Beirut) is a Lebanese politician and retired general of the Lebanese Army. He has served as the Lebanese Minister of Interior and Municipalities from 21 January 2020 to 10 September 2021. He succeeded Raya El Hassan.

Background 
Fahmi was born to a Lebanese mother from the influential Elzein family. He joined the Lebanese army in 1978. He became close to the then head of the Lebanese army general Emile Lahoud (1989–1998) and Jamil Al Sayyed who at the time was second in command of the army's intelligence service. The latter played an important role in his designation as minister of the interior in January 2020. He joined the government of Hassan Diab as an independent.

He held various offices in the Lebanese Army: head of the bomb squad removal unit, head commander of the Mount Lebanon military region, and the security department of the military intelligence services. Fahmi studied at the James Madison University in the United States.

Controversy
On 26 June 2020, Fahmi mentioned in an interview at Al-Manar, that he killed two people in 1981 during the Lebanese Civil War, and Michel Aoun promised to protect him back then. Some analysts wrote that the incident might have happened on 25 November 1978, when Fahmi was a lieutenant officer in the Defense Regiment and Major Michel Aoun was a deputy commander of the First Defense Regiment in Baabda District. However, the victims might have been from the Kataeb Party, after the army decided to install barriers near the Kataeb offices in Haret Hreik.

References

	
1958 births
James Madison University alumni
Lebanese Sunni Muslims
Living people
Politicians from Beirut
Interior ministers of Lebanon
Independent politicians in Lebanon